The Lies Within is a 2019 South Korean television series starring Lee Yoo-young and Lee Min-ki. Based on a novel by Joo Won-gyu, it was developed and produced by Studio Dragon for OCN. It aired from October 12 to December 1, 2019.

Synopsis
The story of a woman who joins the National Assembly and teams up with a detective to save her husband after he abruptly disappears following the sudden death of her father.

Cast

Main
 Lee Min-ki as Jo Tae-sik, a once enthusiastic detective who now lives a completely different life and has requested appointment at a rural police station.
 Lee Yoo-young as Kim Seo-hee, the youngest daughter of an assemblyman who appears sophisticated, but is a disappointment at home due to her family's high standards set by her older sister.

Supporting
 Lee Joon-hyuk as Jung Sang-hoon, Seo-hee's husband who disappeared mysteriously after her father's death.
 On Joo-wan as Jin Young-min, the general manager of JQ Industries.
 Lee Jun-hyeok as Yoo Dae-yong, head of the metropolitan investigation team.
 Kim Si-eun as Kang Jin-kyung, a former member of the national track team.
   as Jeon Ho-gyu, an intelligent policeman who used to work at a major company.
 Kim Jong-soo
 Yoon Bok-in as Kim Seo-hee's mother
 Seo Hyun-woo
 Ye Soo-jung as Coroner
 Song Young-chang
 Jo Ryun
 Kim Hak-sun
 Hong In

Production
The first script reading was held in June 2019 in Sangam-dong, Seoul.

Viewership

Notes

References

External links
  
 
 

OCN television dramas
2019 South Korean television series debuts
2019 South Korean television series endings
South Korean thriller television series
Television series by Studio Dragon
Television shows based on South Korean novels
Korean-language Netflix exclusive international distribution programming